Řeřichy is a municipality and village in Rakovník District in the Central Bohemian Region of the Czech Republic. It has about 100 inhabitants.

Administrative parts
The village of Nový Dvůr is an administrative part of Řeřichy.

References

Villages in Rakovník District